Richard Prause is a German former international table tennis player.

He won a bronze medal at the 1993 World Table Tennis Championships in the Swaythling Cup (men's team event) with Steffen Fetzner, Peter Franz, Oliver Alke and Jörg Roßkopf for Germany.

From 1999 to 2010 he was the national coach of the men's team and since August 2015 has been the sporting director of the German Table Tennis Association.

See also
 List of table tennis players
 List of World Table Tennis Championships medalists

References

German male table tennis players
1968 births
Living people
World Table Tennis Championships medalists
German table tennis coaches
Sportspeople from Oberhausen